We Sing Rock! is a 2011 karaoke game part of the We Sing family of games, developed by French studio Le Cortex. The game features songs from the rock genre of music.

Gameplay
The gameplay is similar to the SingStar set of video games. Players are required to sing along with music in order to score points, matching pitch and rhythm. The game has anticheat technology whereby tapping or humming will register on the screen but no points will be awarded. We Sing Rock! also contains the addition of 'Star Notes' that allow the player to score even more points by matching the pitch and rhythm of certain hard to score parts of songs.

 40 full licensed songs with music videos where available
 Solo Mode
 Multiplayer modes – Group Battle, We Sing, Versus, Pass the Mic, First to X, Expert, Blind, Marathon.
 Real Karaoke mode
 Jukebox mode
 Singing Lessons
 Award System
 Customisable backgrounds
 Four Microphones
 Integrates with a USB hub

Due to hardware limitations with the Wii only having two USB ports, a USB hub is shipped with certain retail versions to add more USB ports. The game uses the standard logitech USB microphone for the Wii.

Track list

The track list for We Sing Rock! was announced on September 26.

 Thirty Seconds to Mars – Kings and Queens 2009
 4 Non Blondes – What's Up
 Alice Cooper – Poison
 Bloc Party – The Prayer
 The Cardigans – My Favourite Game 1998
 Coldplay – Violet Hill
 Creedence Clearwater Revival – Proud Mary
 The Darkness – I Believe in a Thing Called Love 2003
 Daughtry – What About Now
 Def Leppard – Pour Some Sugar On Me 1987
 Elvis Presley – Suspicious Minds
 Europe – The Final Countdown 1986
 Evanescence – Bring Me to Life 2003
 Extreme – More Than Words 1991
 Faith No More – Epic 1990
 Franz Ferdinand – Take Me Out 2004
 Free – All Right Now 1970
 Garbage – I Think I'm Paranoid
 Gossip – Standing in the Way of Control
 Heart – Alone
 INXS – Never Tear Us Apart
 Kasabian – Underdog
 KT Tunstall – Suddenly I See
 Limp Bizkit – Rollin'
 Meredith Brooks – Bitch
 Motörhead – Ace Of Spades
 My Chemical Romance – Welcome to the Black Parade
 The Offspring – Pretty Fly (For A White Guy)
 OK Go – Here It Goes Again 2006
 Panic! at the Disco – Nine in the Afternoon
 Paramore – Ignorance
 The Pretenders – Brass in Pocket
 Robert Palmer – Addicted to Love
 Scorpions – Wind of Change
 Sheryl Crow – All I Wanna Do
 Simple Minds – Don't You (Forget About Me) 1985
 Survivor – Eye of the Tiger
 Tina Turner – The Best 1989
 Wheatus – Teenage Dirtbag 2000
 Whitesnake – Here I Go Again '87

Peripherals

Due to hardware limitations with the Wii only having two USB ports, a USB hub is shipped with certain retail sku's to add more USB ports. The game uses the standard Logitech USB microphone for the Wii.

See also
We Sing
We Sing Encore
SingStar
Karaoke Revolution
Lips

References

External links 
We Sing Website

2011 video games
Europe-exclusive video games
Karaoke video games
Multiplayer and single-player video games
Music video games
THQ Nordic games
Video games developed in France
We Sing
Wii games
Wii-only games
Wired Productions games